Shibukawa (written: 渋川) is a Japanese surname. Notable people with the surname include:

, Japanese actress and voice actress
, Japanese actor
, Japanese astronomer

Japanese-language surnames